Pneumobilia is the presence of gas in the biliary system. It is typically detected by ultrasound or a radiographic imaging exam, such as CT, or MRI. It is a common finding in patients that have recently undergone biliary surgery or endoscopic biliary procedure.  While the presence of air within biliary system is not harmful, this finding may alternatively suggest a pathological process, such as a biliary-enteric anastomosis, an infection of the biliary system, an incompetent sphincter of Oddi, or spontaneous biliary-enteric fistula.

Causes
In a healthy individual with normal anatomy, there is no air within the biliary tree. When this finding is present, it may be secondary to:
 Recent surgical or endoscopic biliary procedure (e.g. ERCP, biliary enteric anastomosis)
 Incompetent sphincter of Oddi (e.g. passage of large gallstone, scarring related to chronic pancreatitis)
 Spontaneous biliary enteric fistula (e.g. gallstone ileus)
 Infection by gas-forming organisms (e.g. emphysematous cholangitis)
 Congenital abnormalities

Other rare causes that have been reported include duodenal diverticulum, paraduodenal abscess, operative trauma, and carcinoma of the duodenum, stomach and bile duct.

References

Further reading
 

Biliary tract disorders
Gases